Oleh Trakalo (born 14 February 1998) is a professional Ukrainian football defender who currently plays for the Ukrainian Premier League club Chornomorets Odesa.

Career
Trakalo is a product of the Sportive youth school Ternopil. His first trainers were Anatoliy Nazarenko and Vasyl Ivehesh.

He made his debut for FC Volyn Lutsk played as a substituted player in the game against FC Karpaty Lviv on 27 May 2017 in the Ukrainian Premier League.

References

External links 

 

1998 births
Living people
Ukrainian footballers
Ukrainian Premier League players
FC Volyn Lutsk players
FC Ternopil players
Association football defenders
Sportspeople from Ternopil Oblast